is a Japanese retired footballer.

Club career stats
Updated to 1 January 2020.

References

External links
Profile at Tokyo Verdy

1984 births
Living people
Chuo University alumni
Association football people from Tokyo
Japanese footballers
J1 League players
J2 League players
Vegalta Sendai players
Tokyo Verdy players
Association football midfielders